"Do What U Gotta Do" is a song by American recording artist Angie Stone. It was written by Isaac Lewis, Levi Stephens, Warren Jones, and Y'anna Crawley for Stone's sixth studio album Rich Girl (2012), while production was helmed by Lewis, Stephens, and Jones. Released as the album's lead single, it reached number 13 on Billboards Adult R&B Songs.

Track listings

Charts

References

External links
 

2012 songs
2012 singles
Angie Stone songs